The indium chalcogenides include all compounds of indium with the chalcogen elements, oxygen, sulfur, selenium and tellurium. (Polonium is excluded as little is known about its compounds with indium). The best-characterised compounds are the In(III) and In(II) chalcogenides e.g. the sulfides In2S3 and InS.
This group of compounds has attracted a lot of research attention because they include semiconductors, photovoltaics and phase-change materials. In many applications indium chalcogenides are used as the basis of ternary and quaternary compounds such as indium tin oxide, ITO and copper indium gallium selenide, CIGS.

Some compounds that were reported and have found their way into text books have not been substantiated by later researchers. The list of compounds below shows compounds that have been reported, and those compounds that have not had their structure determined, or whose existence has not been confirmed by the latest structural investigations, are in italics.

There are a lot of compounds, the reason for this being that indium can be present as 
In3+, oxidation state +3
In+, oxidation state +1
 units, oxidation state of +2, also found in some indium halides, e.g. In2Br3.
The compound In2Te5 is a polytelluride containing the  unit.
None of the indium chalcogenides can be described simply as ionic in nature, they all involve a degree of covalent bonding. However, in spite of this it is useful to formulate the compounds in ionic terms to get an insight into how the structures are built up. Compounds almost invariably have multiple polymorphs, that is they can crystallise in slightly different forms depending on either the method of production, or the substrate upon which they are deposited. Many of the compounds are made up of layers, and it is the different ways that the layers are stacked that is a cause of polymorphism.

In2O, In2Se

In2O is well documented. It exists in the gaseous phase and there are numerous reports of small amounts detected in the solid phase but no definitive structure has been published. It is now believed that the compound described as In2Se was actually a sample of In4Se3.

In4S3, In4Se3, In4Te3

In4S3 had been reported but has more recently been re-investigated and is now believed not to exist. For example the selenide  is formulated as In+··3Se2−.

In5S4

A reinvestigation showed that the original sample was actually SnIn4S4.

InS, InSe, InTe

InS, InSe
InS and InSe are similar, both contain  and have a layer structure. InS for instance can be formulated In24+·2S2−. InSe has two crystal forms β-InSe and γ-InSe that differ only in the way that the layers are stacked. InSe is a semiconductor and a phase change material and has potential as an optical recording medium.
InTe
InTe in contrast to InS and InSe is a mixed valence indium compound containing In+ and In3+ and can be formulated as In+·In3+·2Te2−. It is similar to TlSe and has tetrahedral InTe4 units that share edges. It has potential for use in photovoltaic devices.

In6S7, In6Se7

These compounds are isostructural, and have been formulated with indium in 3 different oxidation states, +1, +2 and +3. They have been formulated as e.g. In+··3In3+·7S2−.   The indium–indium bond length in the In2 units are 2.741 Å (sulfide), 2.760 Å (selenide). In6S7 is an n-type semiconductor.

In3Te4

This compound has been reported as a superconductor. An unusual structure has been proposed  that is effectively In4Te4  but with one quarter of the indium positions vacant. There seems to be no short indium–indium distance that would indicate an In–In unit.

In7Te10

This is formulated as ·12In3+·20Te2−. The In–In distance is 2.763 Å. It has a similar structure to Ga7Te10 and Al7Te10

In2S3, In2Se3, In2Te3

In2S3
Indium(III) sulfide is a yellow or red high melting solid. It is an n-type semiconductor.
In2Se3
Indium(III) selenide is a black compound with potential optical applications.

In2Te3
Indium(III) telluride is a black high melting solid with applications as a semiconductor and in optical material. It has two crystalline forms, α and β.

In3Te5

This was reported  in phase studies in 1964 but its structure has not been confirmed.

In2Te5

This is a polytelluride compound and the structure is made up of layers that in turn are made up of chains of linked  InTe4 tetrahedra where three of the tellurium atoms are bridging.  There are tellurium atoms separate from the chains. The compound has been formulated as (2In3+·Te2−·)n counterbalanced with separate Te2− ions. The structure is similar to Al2Te5.

References

Further reading 
 WebElements

Indium compounds
Chalcogenides
I